The Fight were a Women's Professional Lacrosse League (WPLL) professional women's field lacrosse team based in Long Island, New York.  They played in the WPLL beginning with the 2018 WPLL season. In the 2018 season, the five teams in the WPLL played on a barnstorming format, with all five teams playing at a single venue.

Roster

References

Women's Professional Lacrosse League
Women's lacrosse teams in the United States
Lacrosse teams in New York (state)
Sports teams in New York (state)
Lacrosse clubs established in 2018
2018 establishments in New York (state)
Women's sports in New York (state)